Julie Dawson is an Australian actress, billed briefly as Julie Dawson Daniels. She won the 1974–75 AFI Award for Best Actress for the title role in documentary Who Killed Jenny Langby?, a role that was fully improvised.

Film roles include The Fourth Wish and TV GUEST credits roles include, Matlock Police,  Glenview High and  Neighbours.

Filmography
(source: The Illustrated Encyclopedia of Australian Showbiz, published by Sunshine Books, New South Wales, 1984, by Margot Atterton, and Alan Veitch 

References

External links
 

Australian television actresses
Australian film actresses
Living people
20th-century Australian actresses
Year of birth missing (living people)
21st-century Australian women
21st-century Australian people